Coleophora simplex is a moth of the family Coleophoridae.

References

simplex
Moths described in 1994